The Cal State Fullerton Titans baseball team represents California State University, Fullerton in NCAA Division I college baseball.

Along with the other CSUF athletic teams, the baseball team participates in the Big West Conference. Since its early days, Titan Baseball has been considered an elite program in college baseball, making 18 College World Series appearances and winning four national championships (1979, 1984, 1995, and 2004). 

The Titans play their home games on Fullerton's campus at Goodwin Field and are currently coached by Jason Dietrich.

Conference membership history 
1975–1976: Pacific Coast Athletic Association (PCAA)
1977–1984: SCBA
1985–1989: PCAA
1990–present: Big West Conference

History

1979 national championship

1984 national championship

The Return of Augie Garrido

1995 national championship

George Horton era 

Horton played for Garrido in 1975 and 1976, before beginning his coaching career.  Horton began his coaching career immediately after the 1976 season, but left Cerritos College after 1990 to return to Fullerton as an assistant under Garrido. He would remain in that position, until after the 1996 season. When Garrido left Fullerton for the second time, George Horton was named head coach of the baseball program.

The Titans finished 39–24–1 in Horton's first year, and 47–17 winning the Big West South title in his second year.  Even though he had success in first two seasons, the Titans failed to make it to Omaha. In 1999, Horton led the Titans to their first 50 win season since 1995, and made his first appearance as head coach in the College World Series.  The Titans lost their opening round game to Stanford, but bounced back to beat Texas A&M to give Horton his first career win at the CWS.  That would be the end of the road though for the 1999 Titans, as they lost their next game to Florida St. and were eliminated from the CWS.  Horton would go on to lead the Titans back to Omaha again in 2001 and 2003, but did not reach the championship round.

2004 national championship 

In 2004, Horton and Titans had an up and down regular season, but breezed through conference play.  The Titans compiled an overall record of 36–20, including an impressive 19–2 record in conference play.  The Titans were awarded a host regional site in the 2004 NCAA Division I baseball tournament and the No. 2 seed at their regional.  In regional play, the Titans won their opening round game, but were forced into the loser's bracket after losing to the No. 4 seed, Pepperdine, 7–6.  Facing elimination, the Titans beat No. 1 seed Arizona St. 5–0, who was all the No. 7 national seed that year.  In the championship round, Fullerton left little doubt, defeating Pepperdine 15–1 and 16–3 to advance to the super regional round of play.

Fullerton hosted Tulane in the super regional round after Tulane won the Oxford regional.  Once again, Fullerton completely dominated the games.  They advanced to the College World Series after winning, 9–0 and 10–7.  In the College World Series, the Titans advanced through the winner's bracket beating South Carolina 2–0 and Miami 6–3.  After Carolina advanced through the loser's bracket, they would have to defeat the Titans twice to advance to the championship round.  The Gamecocks won the first contest 5–3, but the Titans fought back the next day to win the second game 4–0.  Fullerton advanced to the championship round for the first time since winning it all in 1995.

The championship round saw Horton face off against his mentor and former Fullerton coach Augie Garrido.  Garrido led Texas back to the championship after previously winning it all with the Longhorns in 2002.  The Titans won the first game in the best-of-three series, 6–4.  On Sunday June 27, 2004, the Titans defeated the Longhorns 3–2 to claim their 4th national title.  The Titans finished the season 47–22 overall.

Horton leaves for Oregon 
After the 2004 national championship, Horton coached the Titans for 3 more season.  After the 2007 season, Horton left his alma mater to become head coach of the Oregon Ducks.  Oregon did not field a baseball team from 1982 until they played their first game in 2009. Oregon reportedly made Horton one of the highest paid coaches in Division I baseball at the time.  Fullerton was left in a similar situation after losing Garrido to Texas after the 1996 season.    During his 11 seasons as head coach of the Titans, Horton compiled a record of 490–212–1.

Dave Serrano era 

After losing another great coach to a school that offered a better financial situation, Fullerton was back in the same position it was 11 years earlier.  A program that was only 3 years removed from its fourth national title was once again in search of a new head coach.  Once again Fullerton went after another former player.  In early September 2007, Dave Serrano became just the fourth head coach of the Cal St. Fullerton Titans baseball program.  Serrano also played under Augie Garrido during his first tenure as Titans coach, and then followed a similar path as Horton.  He began his coaching career at Cerritos College as an assistant, and after a short stint at Tennessee as an assistant George Horton hired him at Fullerton.  Serrano became Horton's top assistant and remained in that position until 2004.  In 2004, he left Fullerton to become head coach at UC Irvine.  After four seasons with the Anteaters, Serrano departed to return to Fullerton.  Serrano had just led the Anteaters to their first ever College World Series.

In his first year as head coach, Serrano posted a 37–19 mark during the regular season.  That mark was good enough to earn the Titans the No. 5 national seed in the 2008 NCAA Division I baseball tournament.  After winning the Fullerton regional, the Titans hosted Stanford during the Super Regional round of play.  The Cardinals won the first game by a single run, and went on to eliminate the Titans the following day.  Overall Serrano posted a 41–22 mark during his first year as head coach of the Titans.

Serrano's improved on the 2008 season success during the 2009 campaign.  Although they finished second in the Big West in 2009, the Titans still finished the regular season with a mark of 42–14.  That record was good enough to earn the Titans the No. 2 national seed during the 2009 NCAA Division I baseball tournament.  The Titans breezed through the Fullerton regional, winning it in 3 games by scores of 18–2, 7–4, and 16–3.  Louisville traveled to Fullerton during the super regional round, and once again Fullerton had no problem with the Cardinals.  Fullerton eliminated Louisville in two games with scores of 12–0 and 11–2.  Serrano earned his first trip to the College World Series as Titans head coach, and his second overall as a head coach.  The Titans failed to meet expectation in Omaha though.  They were quickly eliminated losing their first two games.  They lost their opening round game to Arkansas 10–6, and lost in an elimination game to Virginia 7–5.  The Titans completed the 2009 season with a 47–16 overall record.

Serrano leaves for Tennessee
Serrano was announced as the Tennessee Volunteers baseball head coach on June 15, 2011. He became the 24th head coach of Tennessee baseball, replacing Todd Raleigh.  Much like Garrido and Horton, it is believed that Serrano left for a better financial situation.  According to reports, Serrano made approximately $140,000 at Fullerton, while Tennessee was reportedly offering around $500,000.  During his 4 years as head coach, the Titans compiled a 175–73 record overall.

Rick Vanderhook era 

On June 24, 2011, CSUF named Rick Vanderhook head baseball coach, the fifth coach in the program's esteemed history. He played on the Titan's 1984 national championship team and was an assistant coach from 1985–88 and 1991–2007, at which point he departed to become an assistant coach at UCLA. Three years later, Vanderhook accepted the job on a three-year contract at Fullerton.  Coach Vanderhook's accomplishments to date include NCAA Tournament appearances in almost every year (except 2019) he has been the head coach, the program's second highest single season winning percentage at .836 in 2013, and guiding the 2015 club back to Omaha thus ending a 5-year drought that was the longest lapse in Titans representation at the CWS in 40 years. In 2017, CSUF made its 18th appearance at the CWS, 2nd in the past three years, after winning the Stanford regional and beating Big West rivals CSULB at the Long Beach super regional. Vanderhook retired after the 2021 season.

Goodwin Field 

Goodwin Field is a baseball stadium in Fullerton, California named for Jerry and Merilyn Goodwin, who donated $1 million for renovations. It was opened on April 18, 1992 with a two-game sweep of Loyola Marymount.

Head coaches 
Records updated through end of the 2022 season

Year-by-year NCAA Division I results

Records taken from the Cal. St. Fullerton baseball archive.

National championships

Fullerton in the NCAA tournament
The NCAA Division I baseball tournament started in 1947.
The format of the tournament has changed through the years.
Fullerton began Division I baseball in 1975.
The Titans' all-time NCAA record is 162–88 (.648)
The Titans' Regional record is 106–43 (.711)
The Titans' Super Regional record is 21–14 (.600)
The Titans' are 34–29 (.540) in Omaha

Player awards 
As of the 2021 season, there have been 70 MLB players who previously played for the university.

All-College World Series 

The following is a listing of Cal State Fullerton players that were selected to the all-tournament teams during the College World Series.
^ denotes player was named MOP of the College World Series

1979
Dan Hanggie (3b)
Tony Hudson^ (p)
Kurt Kingsolver (c)
Matt Vejar (of)
1984
Bob Caffrey (c)
Eddie Delzer (p)
John Fishel^ (of)
Blaine Larker (3b)
1988
Jim Osborn (of)

1992
Phil Nevin^ (3b)
James Popoff (p)
Chris Powell (of)
Nate Rodriquez (ss)
1994
Mark Kotsay (of)
1995
Mark Kotsay^ (of)
Brian Loyd (c)
Tony Martinez (3b)
Ted Silva (p)

2001
David Bacani (2b)
2003
P. J. Pilittere (dh)
Justin Turner (ss)
2004
Felipe Garcia (dh)
Ricky Romero (p)
Jason Windsor^ (p)
2006
David Cooper (dh)
Danny Dorn (of)
Justin Turner (2b)
2017
Timmy Richards (ss)

Golden Spikes Award 

The following is a listing of Cal State Fullerton players that received the Golden Spikes Award.

1979
Tim Wallach

1992
Phil Nevin

1995
Mark Kotsay

National Player of the Year awards 

The following is a listing of Cal State Fullerton players who were named national player of the year by various publications.

1979
Tim Wallach – The Sporting News
1992
Phil Nevin – Baseball America

1995
Mark Kotsay – Rotary Smith Award & Collegiate Baseball

2004
Kurt Suzuki – Brooks Wallace Award
2006
Wes Roemer – Collegiate Baseball

Stadiums
On April 18, 1992, Goodwin Field (then known as the third Titan Field) became the home field for Cal State Fullerton Titans baseball. It is the third on-campus park to serve as the Titans' home field. 

The second on-campus stadium, Titan Field, was built around 1970 on the site of Goodwin Field, but with home plate located where the left field foul pole is now located. The Cal State Fullerton Titans football team also played at the stadium from 1980 to 1982. 

The team's first on-campus field, Original Titan Field, was located to the west of Titan House, which is southeast of Goodwin Field. Home plate was laid around 1965 in the southeast corner of a field plowed from citrus groves. 

Throughout the team's history, the Titans also played home games at Amerige Park (1992) and Anaheim's Boysen Park. In 1983, the Titans also played at junior college fields at Fullerton College, Orange Coast College and Santa Ana College during the installation of lights at Titan Field.

See also

List of NCAA Division I baseball programs

References